The English invasion of France of 1230 was a military campaign undertaken by Henry III of England in an attempt to reclaim the English throne's rights and inheritance to the territories of France, held prior to 1224. The English did not seek battle with the French, did not invade the Duchy of Normandy and marched south to the County of Poitou. The campaign on the continent ended in a fiasco, Henry made a truce with Louis IX of France and returned to England. The failure of the campaign led to the dismissal of Hubert de Burgh, 1st Earl of Kent as Justiciar.

Prelude
The fate of Henry's family lands in France still remained uncertain. Reclaiming these lands was extremely important to Henry, who used terms such as "reclaiming his inheritance", "restoring his rights" and "defending his legal claims" to the territories in diplomatic correspondence. The French kings had an increasing financial, and thus military, advantage over Henry. Even under John, the French Crown had enjoyed a considerable, although not overwhelming, advantage in resources, but since then, the balance had shifted further, with the ordinary annual income of the French kings almost doubling between 1204 and 1221.

Louis VIII died in 1226, leaving his 12-year-old son, Louis IX, to inherit the throne, supported by a regency government. The young French King was in a much weaker position than his father, and faced opposition from many of the French nobility who still maintained their ties to England, leading to a sequence of revolts across the country. Against this background, in late 1228 a group of potential Norman and Angevin rebels called upon Henry to invade and reclaim his inheritance, and Peter de Dreux, Duke of Brittany, openly revolted against Louis and gave homage to Henry.

Invasion

Henry embarked from Portsmouth with a large force on 30 April 1230, sailing to and staying at Guernsey on 2 May. The next day (3 May) the English army landed at Saint-Malo, where Peter de Dreux, Duke of Brittany met Henry. On 8 May Henry proceeded to Dinant and thence to Nantes, where he hoped to meet his mother Isabella of Angoulême and her new husband Hugh X of Lusignan, Count of La Marche. A French army, marched to Angers in order to shut the English army out from the County of Poitou, and while Henry remained at Nantes waiting for reinforcements, the French army moved to Oudon, a castle about four leagues distant from Nantes. Many of the Breton nobles did homage to Henry, while some fortified their castles against him. The Poitevin lords generally did him homage, Hugh X of Lusignan, Count of La Marche showed some hesitation, and the Guy I, Viscount of Thouars took the side of Louis. Towards the end of June, the French army was engaged elsewhere, Henry marched through the County of Anjou, taking the castle of Mirebeau late in July, into the County of Poitou and thence into the Duchy of Gascony, where he received the homage of many barons. He then marched back to Brittany, and after staying for several weeks at Nantes, he returned to England, landing at Portsmouth on 27 October 1230, having left a small force under Peter de Dreux, Duke of Brittany and Ranulf de Blondeville, Earl of Chester, to act against the French in Normandy and Brittany.

Notes

Citations

References
 
 
 
 
 
 
 
 

1230s in France
1230 in England
Conflicts in 1230
Invasions by England
Invasions of France
Wars involving France
Wars involving England
13th-century military history of the Kingdom of England